The Orient Historic District is a national historic district in Orient in Suffolk County, New York, United States. The district has 120 contributing buildings and one contributing structure.    They were constructed between the late 18th and late 19th century, the most common building type being a "Cape Cod type," a frame dwelling of one and one half stories sheathed in shingles or clapboard.  It also includes a number of examples of popular 19th-century building styles, such as Italianate.  The focal point of the district is Orient Wharf, established in 1740.

It was added to the National Register of Historic Places in 1976.

References

External links

Oysterponds Historical Society
Poquatuck Hall

Italianate architecture in New York (state)
Historic districts in Suffolk County, New York
Historic districts on the National Register of Historic Places in New York (state)
National Register of Historic Places in Suffolk County, New York